The Regent University College of Science and Technology (often referred to as Regent-Ghana) is located in Accra, Ghana. It was registered in September 2003, and received accreditation to operate as a tertiary institution in 2004. In January 2005 it started its lectures with 30 pioneer students at Trinity Campus, Mataheko.

Now, the University operates from its purpose built campus, located at McCarthy Hill, off the Mallam-Kasoa-Winneba Highway. It is recognized as one of the leading private science and technology Universities in Ghana.

In the 14th edition of the Webometrics Ranking of World Universities, Regent was ranked third best university in Ghana.

Regent University College of Science and Technology was ranked the best private University in Ghana in the July 2020 edition of the Webometrics Ranking of World Universities. Regent is ranked 7th University overall in Ghana in the same edition of the bi-annual ranking.

Organization
The University College has four schools - the School of Business. Leadership and Legal Studies (SBLL), the Faculty of Arts and Sciences : the Faculty of Engineering, Computing and Allied Sciences (FECAS), and the School of Research and Graduate Studies (SRGS). The School of Research and Graduate Studies offers four postgraduate degree programmes - Master of Business Administration (MBA), Master of Science in Statistics, Master of Divinity, and Master of Theology. The MBA programme is jointly offered by Regent University College and the Maastricht School of Management. The School of Research and Graduate Studies provides oversight to all postgraduate programs. There is also the Language Centre and a newly established Centre for Academic Writing. A number of interdisciplinary programmes cross the boundaries between schools and disciplines.

Faculties

School of Business, Leadership and Legal Studies 
The School of Business, Leadership and Legal Studies (SBLL) teaches business courses with a strong computing content. The following are the departments under this school and the undergraduate degree programmes they each offer:

Department of Accounting and Finance
BSc (Hons) Accounting and Information Systems
BSc (Hons) Banking and Finance

Department of Management and Economics
BSc (Hons) Management with Computing
BBA eCommerce

Faculty of Arts and Sciences

Department of Psychology
BSc Human Development and Psychology

Department of Theology, Ministry and Pentecostal Studies
Bachelor of Theology with Management (Honours)

Faculty of Engineering, Computing and Allied Sciences (FECAS) 
The School of Engineering, Computing and Allied Sciences (FECAS) provides ICT-based university education. The following are the departments under the school and the undergraduate degree programmes they offer:

Department of Informatics
BSc (Hons) Computer Science
BSc (Hons) Information Systems Sciences

Department of Engineering & Mathematical Sciences

BEng (Hons) Applied Electronics & Systems Engineering
Telecommunications Engineering Option
Computer Engineering Option
Instrumentation Engineering Option

Postgraduate studies 
Accredited postgraduate degree programmes that the university offers are:
Master of Business Administration (MBA)
Master of Science in Statistics
Master of Divinity
Master of Theology
MSc / MPhil Energy and Sustainability Management
MSc Law and Corporate Administration

Affiliations
The university is affiliated to five other universities.
Kwame Nkrumah University of Science and Technology
 University of Education, Winneba, Ghana
Acadia University, Nova Scotia, Canada
Deggendorf University of Applied Sciences, Deggendorf, Germany
Luleå University of Technology, Sweden
Wheelock College, Boston, USA

See also
List of universities in Ghana

References

External links
National Accreditation Board
Regent University College of Science and Technology Homepage

Universities in Ghana
Scientific organisations based in Ghana
Educational institutions established in 2003
Education in Accra
2003 establishments in Ghana